The Manheim Central School District is a school district in Lancaster County, Pennsylvania.  Manheim Central School District consists of the borough of Manheim, Penn Township, and Rapho Township. Located in northwestern Lancaster County, the school district encompasses 78.2 square miles. The school district lies approximately seven miles north of the City of Lancaster, approximately eighty miles west of the City of Philadelphia and twenty-five miles east of the City of Harrisburg.  In the district, there are four schools: Manheim Central High School, Manheim Central Middle School, Doe Run Elementary School, and Baron Elementary School.

Athletics
Manheim Central currently has teams for the following sporting events:
 Baseball
 Basketball (Boys and Girls)
 Bowling
 Cross-country
 Field Hockey
 Football
 Golf
 Rifle
 Soccer (Boys and Girls)
 Softball
 Swimming
 Tennis (Boys and Girls)
 Track and Field
 Volleyball (Boys and Girls)
 Wrestling
The conference for each of these teams vary.

Football
In 2003, the Manheim Central Barons Football team won the PIAA AAA State Championship against Pine-Richland. They were undefeated for the entire season.
In the following season Manheim Central was state runners-up. In 2009 they went undefeated until the final game, the state championship game, they lost 12-7 to the Selinsgrove Seals. In 2018 the Barons were runners-up after making their way once again to the state final.

Soccer
The Manheim Central soccer team had a successful 2006 season, with a record of 13-1-1. They won their section (as did the junior varsity team), lost in the semifinal of leagues, won the District III championship (defeating Hershey 2 to 1), and finally lost in the AA state championship game to defending champions South Park, 2 to 0. Their coach, Mr. Matthew Schwartz, was 2006 AA Boys Soccer Coach of the Year for Pennsylvania.

See also 
 Official website
Manheim Central High School

References 

School districts in Lancaster County, Pennsylvania